"On the Other Hand" is a song written by Paul Overstreet and Don Schlitz, and recorded by American country music artist Randy Travis. It was first released as a single in July 1985, peaking at number 67 in the United States. It was Travis' first single with Warner Bros. Nashville and was only a minor hit. After the chart successes of Travis' next single, "1982", the label reissued "On the Other Hand" in April 1986, and it became his first number one hit in both the United States and Canada. "On the Other Hand" and "1982" were both included on Travis' 1986 debut album, Storms of Life.

Chart positions

Certifications

References

1985 singles
1986 singles
1985 songs
Songs written by Don Schlitz
Songs written by Paul Overstreet
Randy Travis songs
Keith Whitley songs
Song recordings produced by Keith Stegall
Song recordings produced by Kyle Lehning
Warner Records Nashville singles